Acacia alcockii, also known as Alcock's wattle, is a shrub belonging to the genus Acacia and the subgenus Phyllodineae endemic to South Australia.

The glabrous branchlets are a dark reddish colour. The inflorescences occur on five to eleven headed racemes. The spherical flower-heads contain 25 to 40 pale yellow flowers.

The specific epithet honours C.R.Alcock who was a plant collector wee known for the specimens he collected on the Eyre Peninsula including the first collection of A. alcockii.

It is native to southern parts of the Eyre Peninsula on the south west coast between Mount Dutton and Mount Drummond. On the south east coast the shrub is found between Billy Light Point close to Port Lincoln to the Lincoln National Park where it grows in sandy soils over limestone and sometimes in skeletal soils above granite.

See also
List of Acacia species

References

alcockii
Flora of South Australia
Plants described in 1987
Taxa named by Bruce Maslin